The Jayna Hefford Trophy, was a trophy in women's ice hockey awarded annually to the Canadian Women's Hockey League's most outstanding player in the regular season as judged by the players of the CWHL until the collapse of the league in 2019. It was awarded twice to the same player since its beginnings in 2016. It was a companion to the CWHL's Most Valuable Player Award, as awarded by the league.

The award was named for Brampton Thunder great Jayna Hefford, who had retired from hockey as the all-time leading scorer in the CWHL. The trophy was auctioned off in 2019 after the collapse of the CWHL.

History
The award was first handed out at the conclusion of the 2015–16 CWHL season, during the weekend festivities for the 2016 Clarkson Cup. The inaugural winner of the Trophy was Marie-Philip Poulin of Les Canadiennes de Montreal.

Winners

References

Canadian Women's Hockey League
Awards established in 2016
Most valuable player awards
2016 establishments in Canada